Chaltén has several meanings:

Fitz Roy (also known as Cerro Chaltén), a mountain in Patagonia, South America
El Chaltén, a small village at the base of Cerro Chaltén